Crisanta Duran (born August 23, 1980) is a former American politician who served as the 38th Speaker of the Colorado House of Representatives from 2017 to 2019. A member of the Democratic Party, she was the Colorado State Representative for the 5th district from 2011 to 2019, which encompasses part of northwest Denver. She served as Majority Leader from 2015 to 2017. Duran is the first and only Latina elected Speaker of the House in state history.

Early life 
Duran was born in Boulder, Colorado, and is one of three children. Duran's father worked at a tire shop before eventually becoming the president of the United Food and Commercial Workers Local 7 union.

Education 
Duran graduated from the University of Denver in 2002, double-majoring in Spanish and public policy. Duran earned a Juris Doctor degree from the University of Colorado.

Career 
Duran started her legal career as an attorney with the United Food and Commercial Workers.

Colorado House of Representatives
In 2010, Duran won election to the Colorado House of Representatives for a seat based in western Denver. Duran was elected as the Colorado House majority leader in November 2014. In 2014, the Washington Post named Duran to its "40 under 40" list of rising political stars. She currently serves on the Board of Advisors of Let America Vote, an organization founded by former Missouri Secretary of State Jason Kander that aims to end voter suppression.

Congressional run

On February 24, 2019, Duran announced her campaign to represent Colorado's 1st congressional district after the 2020 United States House of Representatives elections. However, she ended her campaign on October 11, 2019 after failing to attract sufficient support or campaign contributions. Duran had previously considered a run for the United States Senate.

Awards 
 2016 Gabrielle Giffords Rising Star Award. Presented by EMILY's List. April 12, 2016.

See also
List of female speakers of legislatures in the United States

References

External links
 Legislative web page
 Campaign web site

|-

1980 births
21st-century American politicians
21st-century American women politicians
American women lawyers
Colorado lawyers
Hispanic and Latino American state legislators in Colorado
Hispanic and Latino American women in politics
Living people
Politicians from Denver
Speakers of the Colorado House of Representatives
Democratic Party members of the Colorado House of Representatives
Trade unionists from Colorado
United Food and Commercial Workers people
University of Colorado Law School alumni
University of Denver alumni
Women legislative speakers
Women state legislators in Colorado